Events from the year 1647 in art.

Events
Gianlorenzo Bernini begins work on his Memorial to Maria Raggi.

Works

Paintings

Guercino – 
Persian Sibyl
Christ Crowned with Thorns
Peter Lely – Portraits of:
James, Duke of York, Princess Elizabeth and Henry, Duke of Gloucester
Edward Massie
Jan van Goyen – Landscape with Dunes
Paulus Potter – The Bull

Other
Francesco Grue - Altarpiece at the church of San Donato, Castelli, Abruzzo

Births
April 18 - Elias Brenner, Swedish painter and archeologist (died 1717)
November - Jan van Huchtenburg, Dutch painter (died 1733)
date unknown
Jan Baptist Brueghel, Flemish Baroque flower painter (died 1719)
Andrea López Caballero, Spanish painter (died unknown)
Angelo Everardi, Italian painter of battle scenes (died 1680)
Jan Jiří Heinsch, Czech-German painter of the Baroque style (died 1712)
Philippe Magnier, French sculptor (died 1715)
Francis Place, English gentleman draughtsman, potter, engraver and printmaker (died 1728)
probable
Gregorio De Ferrari, Italian painter of the Genoese school (died 1726)
Pieter Xavery, Flemish sculptor (died 1674)
Yu Zhiding, Chinese landscape painter during the Qing Dynasty (died 1709)

Deaths
May 6 - Simon de Passe, Dutch royal engraver and designer of medals (born 1595/1596)
May 19 - Sebastian Vrancx, Flemish Baroque painter and etcher of the Antwerp school (born 1573)
May/June - Pieter Quast, Dutch painter (born 1606)
August 24 - Nicholas Stone, English sculptor and architect (born 1586)
August 27 - Pietro Novelli, Italian painter, architect and stage set designer (born 1603)
November 30 – Giovanni Lanfranco, Italian painter (born 1582)
date unknown
Pietro Desani, Italian painter (born 1595)
Zeng Jing, Chinese painter during the Ming Dynasty (born 1564)
Bartolomé Román, Spanish Baroque painter known for his series of archangels (born 1587)
probable
Sisto Badalocchio, Italian painter and engraver of the Bolognese School (born 1585)
Daniël Mijtens, Dutch portrait painter (born 1590)

 
Years of the 17th century in art
1640s in art